Italy at the European Road Championships is an overview of the Italian results at the European Road Championships. Italy hosted the European Road Championships in Bergamo in 2002, in Verbania in 2008, in Offida in 2011, and in Trentino in 2021.

List of medalists

Medals by year

Medals by discipline
updated after the 2020 European Road Championships

See also

 France at the European Road Championships
 Netherlands at the European Road Championships
 Sweden at the European Road Championships
 Ukraine at the European Road Championships

References

External links
Results at the European Cycling Union website
Older results at:
Results men's RR U-23 (cyclingarchives)
Results men's ITT U-23 (cyclingarchives)
Results women's RR U-23 (cyclingarchives)
Results women's ITT U-23 (cyclingarchives)
Results men's RR Juniors (cyclingarchives)
Results men's ITT Juniors (cyclingarchives)
Results women's RR Juniors (cyclingarchives)
Results women's ITT Juniors (cyclingarchives)

Nations at the European Road Championships